Arius malabaricus is a species of sea catfish in the family Ariidae. It was described by Francis Day in 1877. It inhabits the marine and brackish waters of India, in the Indian Ocean.

References

malabaricus
Taxa named by Francis Day
Fish described in 1877